Aaron Haroon Rashid simply known as Haroon, is a British-born Pakistani Peabody award winning singer-songwriter, music producer, composer, director and social activist. 

Formerly a member of the pop band Awaz in the 1990s, Haroon has sold millions of singles and albums worldwide and has performed at large venues such as the Wembley Arena.

Early life 
Haroon was born in London, England, to a Pakistani born-father and New Zealand mother.

As the founding CEO of Unicorn Black, an animation production company, he is the creator and director of the 3D animated children's television series Burka Avenger which received critical acclaim. His company has also produced Teetoo and Tania, Quaid Say Baatein and other successful animated series.

Music career

Awaz
After graduating in the early 1990s with a degree in business administration from George Washington University in the United States, he formed the band Awaz with a couple of musician friends, Faakhir and Assad Ahmed.

Haroon and the band made a video of Janeman, a song which Haroon had composed when he was 16. He sent it to MTV Asia, and the song went down in history as the first ever Urdu and Pakistani song to air on the channel.

The band gained instant fame because of their catchy tunes, good looks, lavish music videos, and crazy stage performances. Having sold millions of albums worldwide, Awaz is considered one of the most successful bands in Pakistan. The band split after being together for 9 years, and the members went on to pursue solo careers.

Solo career
Haroon's first career solo album, Haroon Ki Awaz, which he produced, engineered and recorded himself, was released in October 2000.

In 2001 and 2002, he toured the UK and US. In 2001, Haroon received the "Outstanding Contribution to Asian Music" award from the BBC Asia Awards show.

Haroon released his third solo album, Haroon Ka Nasha in March 2007, again composed, recorded, produced, engineered and mixed by himself at his personal studio.

Throughout his music career, Haroon has regularly produced songs and videos with socially conscious messages such as the anti-corruption hit Mr. Fraudiay and Ghoom Ghoom which provided a message of interfaith. He has sold over five million albums worldwide. He is also an audio engineer, having set up his own recording studio.

Haroon has campaigned for peace and tolerance and highlighted corruption through his music. In 2007, he received the Ambassador for Peace award in Denmark from the Youth for Human Rights Organization. He is the co-founder of the All Music Performers Pakistan Society (AMPPS), which focuses on rights for musicians. Haroon served as a board member of the Pakistan Copyright Board, working closely with the Intellectual Property Organization of Pakistan (IPOP) and WIPO (World Intellectual Property Organization) to help set up Pakistan's first royalty collection organization.

Burka Avenger
Haroon is the creator and director of Burka Avenger, described as Pakistan's first ever full-length 3D animated television series for children. This is a Pakistani version of 'Superman', 'Batman' and 'Superwoman' combined. The series won several major international accolades, including:

Time magazine named Burka Avenger as one of the most influential characters of 2013. Haroon said he created the series as a way to emphasise the importance of girls' education in Pakistan and abroad, as well as issues such as equality and discrimination. The show features Jiya, an "inspirational school teacher" whose alter ego is a burka-wearing super-heroine that fights for justice, peace and education for all.

Taazi.com

Haroon has launched Pakistan’s first of its kind digital content delivery platform called Taazi.com, which aims to combat piracy in a country where music and movies have a high piracy rate. Taazi.com has developed a unique mobile telecom integrated billing system, which allows users to pay via their mobile phone balances for online music, TV shows and movies.

Discography

Albums
 Haroon ki awaz (2001)
 Lagan (2003)
 Haroon Ka Nasha (2007)

Singles and videos
 "Janeman" (1994)
 "Diya" (1994)
 "Watan Kahani" (1993)
 "Jadoo Ka Chiragh" – with Awaz (1995)
 "Main Na Manoo Haar" – with Awaz (1996)
 "Mr. Fraudiay" – with Awaz (1996)
 "Aye Jawan" – with Awaz (1997)
 "Tu Hi Jeet" – with Awaz (1998)
 "Yara" – (2001)
 "Pyareya" (2001)
 "Jeekay Dekha" (2001)
 "Tu Hai Kahan" – with Vital Signs and Strings (2001)
 "Mehndi" (2002)
 "Mahbooba" (2002)
 "Dil Se" (2003)
 "Jao Tum" (2003)
 "Goriye" – Remix (2004)
 "Jiay Jaye" (2006)
 "Jua Khela" (2007)
 "Ishq Nasha" (2007)
 "Nahi Hai Yeh Pyar" (2008)
 "Big Corporation Man" (2009)
 "Ibtada-e-Ishq" (2009)
 "Nahin Hai' ft KOSTAL (2010)
 "Go Sabjee Go" (2010)
 "Ghoom Ghoom" (2011)
 "Lady in Black" with Adil Omar (2013)
 "Baba Bandook" with Ali Amzat (2013)
 "Dil Say Pakistan" with Muniba Mazari (2017)
 "Dhundoonga" – (2020)

Personal life
Haroon was born on 11 May 1973 in London, England, to a Pakistani father and New Zealand mother. According to Haroon, he belonged to a musically-inclined family and had always wanted to become an artist; his mother, Lynley Ruth Richards, was a professionally trained opera singer, and has taught Western classical music in Pakistan for nearly 50 years.

Haroon's grandfather, Abdul Rashid, established a reputed carpet manufacturing business specialising in handmade Pakistani and Persian rugs since 1947. Haroon's father, Zulfiqar, was one of eight sons. After living in the UK for several years, Zulfiqar returned to Lahore in the early 1970s with his wife to run the family business. He later moved to Islamabad where he established a carpet showroom while Lynley taught music, acting and theatrical production. Haroon grew up and received his schooling at the American International School of Islamabad (ISOI) in Pakistan. His father died in 2017.
Haroon married Farwa Hussain in June 2020 but they mutually and amicably ended their marriage on good terms in 2021.

Haroon, the eldest of his siblings, has two brothers Daoud and Ben, and a sister, Laila.

"Haroon is an avid reader and does a lot of reading on flight or while waiting at airports".

See also
 List of Pakistani musicians
 List of Pakistani musical groups

References

External links
 

1973 births
Living people
Awaz members
British people of New Zealand descent
British people of Pakistani descent
British pop singers
British record producers
British male singer-songwriters
Pakistani audio engineers
Pakistani people of Kashmiri descent
Pakistani people of New Zealand descent
Pakistani pop singers
Pakistani record producers
Pakistani male singer-songwriters
Singers from London
Pakistani animated film directors
Pakistani rock keyboardists
Pakistani rock guitarists
English people of New Zealand descent